Alternative hip hop (also known as alternative rap and experimental hip hop) is a subgenre of hip hop music that encompasses a wide range of styles that are not typically identified as mainstream. AllMusic defines it as comprising "hip hop groups that refuse to conform to any of the traditional stereotypes of rap, such as gangsta, bass, hardcore, and party rap. Instead, they blur genres drawing equally from funk and pop/rock, as well as jazz, soul, reggae, and even folk."

Alternative hip hop developed in the late 1980s and experienced a degree of mainstream recognition during the early-to-mid 1990s. While some groups such as Arrested Development and The Fugees managed to achieve commercial success before breaking up, many alternative rap acts tend to be embraced by alternative rock listeners other than hip-hop or pop audiences.  The commercial and cultural momentum was impeded by the then  -also emerging, significantly harder-edged West Coast gangsta rap. A resurgence came about in the late 1990s and early 2000s at the dawn of the digital era with a rejuvenated interest in independent music by the general public.

During the 2000s, alternative hip hop reattained its place within the mainstream due to the declining commercial viability of gangsta rap as well as the crossover success of artists such as Outkast and Kanye West. The alternative hip hop movement has expanded beyond the United States to include the Somali-Canadian poet K'naan, and English artist M.I.A. Alternative hip hop acts have attained much critical acclaim, but receive relatively little exposure through radio and other media outlets. The most prominent alternative hip hop acts include A Tribe Called Quest, De La Soul, Hieroglyphics, The Pharcyde, Digable Planets and Black Sheep.

History

Origin
Originating in the late 1980s, in midst of the golden age of hip hop, alternative hip hop was headed primarily by East Coast groups such as De La Soul, Jungle Brothers, A Tribe Called Quest, Pete Rock & CL Smooth, Brand Nubian, and Digable Planets in subsidiary conjunction by West Coast acts such as The Pharcyde, Digital Underground, Souls of Mischief, Del the Funky Homosapien, and Freestyle Fellowship as well as certain Southern acts such as Arrested Development, Goodie Mob, and Outkast. Similar to the alternative rock movement, alternative hip hop segued into the mainstream at the dawn of the 1990s. Arrested Development, along with The Fugees, stand as some of the first few alternative rap to be recognized by mainstream audiences. The classic debut albums 3 Feet High and Rising, People's Instinctive Travels and the Paths of Rhythm, and Bizarre Ride II the Pharcyde achieved minor commercial success as they garnered immense acclaim from music critics, who described the records as managing to be both ambitiously innovative but playful masterpieces, hailing the artists as the future of hip hop music as a whole.

Mid–late 1990s: Mainstream decline 
Contrary to alternative rock, which went on to become a mainstay in mainstream music and replaced the glam metal of the previous generation as the most popular form of rock music, alternative hip hop's commercial momentum was impeded by the then also newly emerging, significantly harder-edged West Coast gangsta rap. With its aggressive tone, nihilistic tendencies, and violent imagery, gangsta rap was considered to be the more entertaining, more lucrative subgenre as signified by the high chart placings, radio success and multiplatinum-selling records of gangsta rappers such as Snoop Dogg, Warren G and N.W.A, who were widely embraced by major record labels and produced a legion of imitators. Albums such as Straight Outta Compton, The Chronic and Doggystyle redefined the direction of hip hop, which resulted in lyricism concerning the gangsta lifestyle becoming the driving force of sales figures. The situation broke way around the mid-90s with the emergence and mainstream popularity of East Coast hardcore rap artists such as Wu-Tang Clan, Nas, The Notorious B.I.G., and Mobb Deep. Following this development, many alternative rap acts eventually either disbanded or faded into obscurity.

In his 1995 book on the current state of hip hop culture, music critic Stephen Rodrick wrote that, at that time, alternative hip-hop had "drawn little more than barely concealed yawns from other rappers and urban audiences" and came to the conclusion that the subgenre was a complete failure.

Late 90s–2010s: Revival 
However, a commercial breakthrough came about in the late 1990s with the rejuvenated interest in indie music by the general public due to the mainstream success of acts like The Fugees and Arrested Development. While acts such as Slum Village, Common, and The Roots were rising to prominence. 

The Fugees saw huge critical and commercial success with the release of their second album, The Score in 1996. The album peaked at number-one on the US Billboard 200 chart, and briefly became the best-selling album of all time. That same year, saw A Tribe Called Quest reached their commercial peak with the release of their album Beats, Rhymes and Life, which reached number-one on the US Billboard 200 and became their best-selling release; while acts such as OutKast and De La Soul released some of their most definitive albums with Atliens and Stakes Is High.

Since the mid-1990s, independent record labels such as Rawkus Records, Rhymesayers, Anticon, Stones Throw and Definitive Jux have experienced lesser mainstream success with alternative rap acts such as Jurassic 5, Little Brother, Talib Kweli, MF DOOM, Atmosphere, Antipop Consortium, Mos Def, Doomtree, Pharoahe Monch, El-P, Quasimoto, Living Legends, CYNE, Blue Scholars, and Aesop Rock. It was in the 2000s that alternative hip hop reattained its place within the mainstream, due in part to the declining commercial viability of gangsta rap as well as the crossover success of artists such as Outkast, Kanye West, and Gnarls Barkley.

Not only did Outkast's fifth studio album Speakerboxxx/The Love Below (2003) receive universal acclaim from music critics and manage to appeal to listeners of all ages spanning numerous musical genres but also spawned two number-one hit singles. The album eventually went on to win a Grammy Award for Album of the Year—making it only the second hip hop album to win the award (The Miseducation of Lauryn Hill being the first) and has been certified diamond by selling 11 times platinum by the Recording Industry Association of America (RIAA).

MF DOOM had also been on the come up in the alternative/underground scene after releasing his debut studio album Operation: Doomsday.  He would come back to the hip-hop scene after the dissolving of hip-hop group KMD.  Later, he and Madlib's 2004 project Madvillainy would be released in this time period under the illustrious hip-hop duo Madvillain. This album was praised by music critics; and would forever inspire many upcoming artists such as Aminé and Joey Badass.

Gnarls Barkley experienced a surprise hit with their debut single "Crazy". Due to high download sales, it reached number-one of the single charts in several countries, including the United Kingdom, where it became the best selling single of 2006. The song was named the best song of 2006 by both Rolling Stone and the Village Voice annual Pazz & Jop critics poll. Rolling Stone later ranked "Crazy" as the number-one song of the entire decade. The song has since been certified double platinum by RIAA. The duo were the recipient of multiple accolades, at the 49th Grammy Awards, they won the awards for Best Urban/Alternative Performance and Best Alternative Music Album.

Industry observers view the 2007 sales competition between Kanye West's Graduation and 50 Cent's Curtis as a turning point for hip hop. West emerged the victor, selling nearly a million copies in the first week alone. Ben Detrick of XXL cited the outcome of the sales competition as being responsible for altering the direction of hip hop and paving the way for new rappers who didn't follow the hardcore-gangster mold, writing, "If there was ever a watershed moment to indicate hip hop's changing direction, it may have come when 50 Cent competed with Kanye in 2007 to see whose album would claim superior sales. 50 lost handily, and it was made clear that excellent song crafting trumped a street-life experience. Kanye led a wave of new artists—Kid Cudi, Wale, Lupe Fiasco, Kidz in the Hall, Drake, Nicki Minaj—who lacked the interest or ability to create narratives about any past gunplay or drug-dealing." Similarly, in a retrospective article, Rosie Swash of The Guardian viewed the album's sales competition with 50 Cent's Curtis as a historical moment in hip hop, writing that it "highlighted the diverging facets of hip-hop in the last decade; the former was gangsta rap for the noughties, while West was the thinking man's alternative."

Several burgeoning artists and groups acknowledge being directly influenced by their 1990s predecessors in addition to alternative rock groups while their music has been noted by critics as expressing eclectic sounds, life experiences and emotions rarely seen in mainstream hip hop. As traditional rock music continually becomes less synonymous with pop music, more left-of-center artists who are not fully embraced by hip-hop radio have increasingly found inclusion on alternative radio. According to Nielsen SoundScan, contemporary hip-hop acts who increasingly receive domestic airplay on alt-radio include Run the Jewels, Childish Gambino, Logic, Brockhampton, L.I.F.T. and nothing, nowhere. Regarding audiences, according to Jeff Regan, senior director of music programming for the Alt Nation channel on Sirius XM Radio, "This generation has maybe never even gone to a record store or CD store where there was a hip-hop section and a rock section — it has all been in front of them on a screen." It's for this reason that recording artists and groups traditionally perceived as rappers are included on his predominantly rock-oriented playlists, saying, "Whether it’s Lil Peep or Brockhampton or Post Malone, we have tried records from all those artists. ... We need some depth perception in the music we're presenting. Whether it’s done on a laptop or on an amp and a guitar, I just want to find something new — that’s what alternative is supposed to be."

Critical and cultural reactions
While some groups managed to achieve commercial success, most alternative rap acts tended to be embraced largely by alternative rock listeners and indie music fans rather than hip-hop or pop audiences. Artists receive limited exposure through commercial radio and other media outlets and primarily rely on campus radio and various independent media channels. Alternative hip hop is the recipient of consistent critical acclaim but is generally shunned by American mainstream media and widely regarded as commercially unappealing. New York radio personality and spoken word artist Imhotep Gary Byrd's single "The Crown" was rejected by American radio stations for being "too Black and too positive." However, the song was very well received and become a hit in Europe. It reached number 6 on the UK Singles Chart, becoming the longest record ever to reach the top 10 in the history of the British Charts. Over the years, multiple organizations representing African-Americans such as the National Black Leadership Alliance and the National Congress of Black Women have released statements criticizing how urban radio stations refuse to play rap music that does not demean and degrade black women, censoring out alternative hip-hop artists such as Arrested Development and Dead Prez. Q-Tip, frontman of the highly influential alternative rap group A Tribe Called Quest, had his sophomore solo effort Kamaal the Abstract shelved for nearly a decade after his record label deemed the genre-bending album as sounding uncommercial. Q-Tip was quoted as saying:

Similarly, BET infamously refused to play "Lovin' It", the lead single of North Carolina-based alt-rap duo Little Brother's socio-politically charged concept album The Minstrel Show, which provided a tongue-in-cheek critique of African-American pop culture, on the grounds that the group's music was "too intelligent" for their target audience. The network was subsequently satirized by the animated series The Boondocks – which regularly features underground/alternative rap as background music – in the banned episode The Hunger Strike. The episode, which portrayed BET as an evil organization dedicated to the self-genocidal mission of eradicating black people through violent, overtly sexual programming, was banned by Cartoon Network and has yet to be aired in the United States.

The alternative hip hop movement is not limited solely to the United States, as genre-defying rappers such as Somali-Canadian poet K'naan, and especially British artist M.I.A. have achieved considerable worldwide recognition. K'naan's 2009 single Wavin' Flag reached number two on the Canadian Hot 100 while its various remixes topped the charts in several countries. Shing02 was chosen for rapping "Battlecry", the theme song of the hit hip-hop-influenced chanbara anime Samurai Champloo, which was produced by Japanese jazz rap DJ Nujabes. Time magazine placed M.I.A in the Time 100 list of "World's Most Influential people" for having "global influence across many genres." Groups like the British virtual band Gorillaz also experienced mainstream popularization during this period of time, selling over 20 million albums total between the albums Gorillaz and Demon Days. Today, due in part to the increasing usage of social networking as well as online distribution, many alternative rap artists are able to find acceptance by far-reaching audiences.

See also
List of alternative hip hop artists

References

Further reading

Bibliography

 
1980s in music
1990s in music
2000s in music
2010s in music
Hip hop genres